The discography of the American guitarist and composer John Fahey consists of thirty-six studio albums, five live albums and sixteen compilation albums, as well as five tribute albums.


Studio albums

Live albums

Compilation albums

Tribute albums

References

External links
"The Fahey Files" at John Fahey's official website

Discographies of American artists
Folk music discographies
Blues discographies